Garthorpe is a village in North Lincolnshire, England. Together with Fockerby, which is contiguous with the village, Garthorpe forms a civil parish of about 500 inhabitants, measured as 418 in the 2011 census.

Geography
Fockerby is immediately to the west, and the two places now form one community. Three minor roads radiate from the village centre. That to the north leads to Adlingfleet, while the road to the south-west leads to Luddington. A third road heads eastwards, and used to serve the ferry to Burton upon Stather, but now stops short of the banks of the Trent. It turns to the south, and follows the western bank of the river. West of the road and the river is the site of the deserted medieval village of Waterton.

History 
Before the seventeenth century, the River Don, its waters swelled by those of the River Idle and the River Torne, crossed the region on a meandering course from Crowle to Adlingfleet, where it entered the River Trent. However, in 1626, the Dutch drainage pioneer Cornelius Vermuyden re-routed all three rivers as part of the drainage of Hatfield Chase. Prior to the work, Garthorpe lay on the east bank of the Don in Lincolnshire while Fockerby lay in Yorkshire.

Before the opening of the Keadby Road and rail bridge in 1916, there existed a boat ferry from the east end of the village along Shore Road to Burton upon Stather across the River Trent.

From 1903, the village was served by Fockerby railway station. The line was taken over by the North Eastern Railway and the Lancashire and Yorkshire Railway in early 1903, and became the Axholme Joint Railway. The station was initially named Garthorpe, but then became Fockerby. Passenger services were withdrawn in 1933, and the line closed to freight on 5 April 1965. The train was met at Fockerby by the headmistress and all of the pupils from Garthorpe County Primary School. Incoming freight traffic on the line included manure and coal, while most outgoing traffic was agricultural produce, including potatoes and tulips.

Garthorpe is barely above sea level - and is about 1 mile from the tidal river Trent protected by large levees. Positioned midway between Goole and Scunthorpe, transport to and from must be by car. A local bus service is available.

In 2011 there was a local pub called the Bay Horse, but no shops. The Methodist Chapel closed at the end of 2010, and the local Anglican church is under threat also. The village also had another pub called the 'Plough Inn' which closed in 1918. In the 1860s, this had two signs, one showing the "Plough", and the other showing "Red Lion". There was also a public house situated adjacent to the River Trent where the ferry crossed to Burton upon Stather. This was called the "Sheffield Arms" on a map of 1886, and "The Webbs Hotel" by 1907. Both The Plough and Webbs Hotel closed in 1916.

During the 18th century, the local area was frequented by two notable highwaymen. Ned Mandrell was the earliest, and was said  to have been a ruthless villain who was scared by none. It is thought that he was captured and hung and his remains buried at the southern end of Carr Lane, where the grass triangle is situated. The other was Snowden Dunhill, who lived much of his life in the village of Spaldington near Howden. His main hiding area was a place called Cow Lane, a local common pasture which everybody crossed as means as a short cut between the villages. After he was finally captured and sentenced at York Assizes, he was transported to Tasmania, Australia. When he had spent his time of hard labour and was due to be released, he died and never returned to be with the family who was waiting for him.

Gallery

Bibliography

References

External links

Isle of Axholme Family History Society
Isle of Axholme website

Villages in the Borough of North Lincolnshire